Maria Mikaela Markuntytär Ylipää (born 8 August 1981) is a Finnish singer and actress, who has starred in the musical Kristina från Duvemåla (Helsinki 2012, Göteborg 2014, Stockholm 2015) and acted in the films Keisarikunta (2004) and Pietà (2007). She has also appeared in the television series Rikospoliisi Maria Kallio (2003), Tappajan näköinen mies (2011) and Luottomies (2016) as well as musical theatres Helsinki City Theatre, Tampere Workers' Theatre, Swedish Theatre, Gothenburg opera house and the Stockholm Cirkus.

Ylipää has sung with Jukka Leppilampi, Jiri Kurose and Jarmo Savolainen on their albums and in 2011, on the Dallapé Orchestra album, Soittajan sussu. In spring 2009, she was also present at the music theatre 's performances. She has also released the solo album Onerva and made a joint album with Emma Salokoski. Ylipää graduated from Tampere Communal High School
in 2000 and acting at the Helsinki Theatre Academy in 2005.

In 2007, Ylipää was first elected as ambassador to the Church of Finland's External Aid together with musician Juha Tapio.

Maria Ylipää's spouse is musician Matti Pentikäinen and they have two children.

Filmography

Films
Keisarikunta (2004) – Aila
Pietà (television film, 2007) – Maria
Miss Farkku-Suomi (2012) – Kara
Ollaan vapaita (2015) – Selja
Tappajan näköinen mies (2016) – Marja Takala

Television series
Tappajan näköinen mies (2011) – Marja Takala
Moska (2011) – seller
Luottomies (2016, 2017) – Harriet Mäkinen-Renwall
Aallonmurtaja (2017) – Tuula
Lakeside Murders (2021, 2022) – Ulla Lundelin

Voice roles
Tangled (2011) – Rapunzel
Helinä-Keiju ja siipien salaisuus (2012) – Fawn
Helinä-keiju ja Mikä-mikä-hirviön arvoitus (2014) – Fawn
Helinä-keiju ja merirosvokeiju (2014) – Fawn

Source

Theatre roles

Helsinki City Theatre
Cherbourgin sateenvarjot (2002)
Tuhkimo (2003)
Miss Saigon (2004)
Evita (2006)
Wicked (2010)

Tampere Workers' Theatre
Suruttomat

Swedish Theatre
Spin (2005)
Kristina från Duvemåla (2012)
Chess (2018)

Gothenburg Opera
Kristina från Duvemåla (2014)

References

External links
Maria Ylipää Elonetissä 

Maria Ylipää on Actors in Scandinavian 
Maria Ylipää – artikkelit Yle.fi 

Finnish actresses
Finnish jazz musicians
People from Ylöjärvi
1981 births
Living people